Williamsburg is a statutory town located in Fremont County, Colorado, United States. The town population was 662 at the 2010 census, down from 714 at the 2000 census. The Florence post office (ZIP code 81226) serves Williamsburg.

Geography
Williamsburg is located in southeastern Fremont County at  (38.383623, -105.160337). It is bordered to the east by the city of Florence and to the south by the town of Rockvale.

Demographics

As of the census of 2000, there were 714 people, 235 households, and 199 families residing in the town. The racial makeup of the town was 93.14% White, 0.14% African American, 1.40% Native American, 0.28% Asian, 1.26% from other races, and 3.78% from two or more races. Hispanic or Latino of any race were 5.74% of the population.

There were 235 households, out of which 41.3% had children under the age of 18 living with them, 71.1% were married couples living together, 10.2% had a female householder with no husband present, and 15.3% were non-families. 12.8% of all households were made up of individuals, and 3.0% had someone living alone who was 65 years of age or older. The average household size was 3.00 and the average family size was 3.25.

In the town, the population was spread out, with 31.2% under the age of 18, 5.9% from 18 to 24, 30.8% from 25 to 44, 23.9% from 45 to 64, and 8.1% who were 65 years of age or older. The median age was 34 years. For every 100 females, there were 101.7 males. For every 100 females age 18 and over, there were 101.2 males.

The median income for a household in the town was $34,792, and the median income for a family was $34,583. Males had a median income of $32,159 versus $19,063 for females. The per capita income for the town was $14,646. About 9.9% of families and 13.0% of the population were below the poverty line, including 19.8% of those under age 18 and none of those age 65 or over.

See also

 List of municipalities in Colorado

References

External links

 
 Town of Williamsburg contacts
 CDOT map of the Town of Williamsburg

Towns in Fremont County, Colorado
Towns in Colorado